Morteza Fonounizadeh (born 23 February 1961 in Tehran, Iran) is an Iranian football former player.

Honours

Iran 
AFC Asian Cup
 1984, Fourth Place
 1988, Third Place
Asian Games
1986 Asian Games Quarter Final

Persepolis FC 
Asian Cup Winners' Cup
1990–91 Champions
Qods League
1989–1990 Runner-up
Hazfi Cup
  1987    Champions
1991–1992 Champions
Tehran provincial league
1986 Champions
1987 Champions
1988 Champions
1989 Champions
1990 Champions
1991 Runner-up

Shahin 

Tehran provincial league
1984 Champions
1985 Runner-up

References

1961 births
Living people
People from Tehran
Iranian footballers
Iran international footballers
Persepolis F.C. players
Shahin FC players
Rah Ahan players
1988 AFC Asian Cup players
Association football defenders
Footballers at the 1986 Asian Games
Asian Games competitors for Iran